Norvegia Bay is a cove at the north side of Cape Ingrid on the west side of Peter I Island. Named after the Norvegia, the Norwegian research vessel which visited the island in February 1929. The crew engaged in charting the island and in sounding and dredging operations.

References

Bays of Ellsworth Land
Peter I Island